The Aga Khan School, Dhaka, is an English Medium School, in Uttara, Dhaka under the Aga Khan Development Network (AKDN)  and the Aga Khan Education Service, Bangladesh (AKES,B).  It is one of the earliest private English Medium schools in Bangladesh founded in 1988, in a small campus in Siddeshwari, Dhaka.

History
The Aga Khan School, Dhaka, was formed back in 1988, in the library of the Ismaili Tariqah and Religious Education Board (ITREB), an institution of the Aga Khan Education Service, Bangladesh. The foundations of the present system were laid by Sir Sultan Mohamed Shah, Aga Khan III, under whose guidance, over 200 schools were established during the first half of the 20th century, the first of them in 1905 in Zanzibar, Gwadur in Pakistan and Mundra in India. Since the creation of Aga Khan Education Service companies in the 1970s, the schools have been administered and managed centrally. The school started with 25 students and 7 teaching staff, occupying classes IX to XII.

In August of 1990, the present senior section opened in Uttara. The junior and primary sections were opened in 1999 and 2000 respectively.

The school achieved a major milestone in April 2009, when it was authorized as an International Baccalaureate World School.

In 2009, the longest serving Head of Education, George G. Kays, retired, serving the school from July 1998 to June 2009. Jacqueline Parai served as the Head of the School from 2009 to 2011.

Dale Taylor is the current Head of Education.

Description
As of 2013, the school consists of a student body of 1,222 and a faculty of 118 teachers. The school offers education from preschool to higher secondary levels (playgroup, nursery, kindergarten I and II and grades 1 to 12), following the British national curriculum, designed to prepare students for IGCSE and GCE Advanced Level examinations.

Fahmida Chowdhury is serving as Head of Secondary School, while Shatila Reza is serving as Head of Middle School. The Chairman of the Board is Mr. Suleiman Ajanee. The school organizes annual events, functions and concerts. Annually, the Ordinary and Advanced Level examinees of Aga Khan School perform impressively in the exams, as evidenced by their presence at The Daily Star Awards for schools following the Cambridge International Examinations.

International Baccalaureate certification

The school has been an IB World School since April 2009. It offers the IB Primary Years Programme in English. Additionally, the school is moving to the complete IB Curriculum, which will be conducted at new premises at Bashundhara, Dhaka. The institute offering the IB program will be named The Aga Khan Academy.

The proposed Aga Khan Academy has been in the planning stages for several years, and the Aga Khan Education Service, Bangladesh (AKES,B) have obtained pre-authorisation from the International Baccalaureate Organisation (IBO) to implement the IB Primary Years Programme (IB-PYP) in pre-school (Play Group and Nursery), Kindergarten and Grades 1 to 5.

His Highness Prince Karim Aga Khan IV, on his visit to Bangladesh, laid the foundation stone for the Aga Khan Academy in Basundhara, Dhaka. This will be a full-fledged IBO authorised school offering the Primary Years Program (PYP), the Middle Years Program (MYP) for Grades 6 to 10, and the Diploma Programme (IB-DP) for students in Grades 11 and 12. However, little construction has been completed.

The academy will have International Academic Partnership (IAP) agreements with Phillips Academy in Andover, Massachusetts, United States and Schule Schloss Salem in Salem, Baden-Württemberg, Germany.

List of Heads of Education

School Leadership Team
As of Oct 2017, the School Leadership Team consists of:

See also

 Aga Khan Education Services
 Aga Khan Development Network
 Aga Khan Academies

References

External links
 
 
 
 

Educational institutions of Uttara
Cambridge schools in Bangladesh
Dhaka
Aga Khan School, Dhaka
Educational institutions established in 1988
International Baccalaureate schools in Bangladesh
1988 establishments in Bangladesh